James Direaux (born 1916) is an American former Negro league pitcher who played in the 1930s.

A native of Pasadena, Direaux made his Negro leagues debut in 1937 with the Washington Elite Giants. He played for the Elite Giants again the following season when the team moved to Baltimore, and went on to play several seasons in the Mexican League.

References

External links
 and Seamheads

1916 births
Date of birth missing
Baltimore Elite Giants players
Washington Elite Giants players
Baseball pitchers
Baseball players from Pasadena, California
Possibly living people